"Dogman" is a song by the American band King's X. It was released as a single in support of their 1994 album Dogman.

Track listing 
US CD promo single (PRCD 5396-2)
"Dogman" (Jerry Gaskill, Doug Pinnick, Ty Tabor) – 4:01

Charts

Personnel
Adapted from the Dogman liner notes.

King's X
 Jerry Gaskill – drums
 Doug Pinnick – lead vocals, bass
 Ty Tabor – guitar

Production and additional personnel
 Nick DiDia – recording
 Bob Ludwig – mastering
 Brendan O'Brien – production, mixing

Release history

References

External links 
 Dogman at Discogs (list of releases)

1994 songs
1994 singles
King's X songs
Songs written by Jerry Gaskill
Songs written by Doug Pinnick
Songs written by Ty Tabor
Song recordings produced by Brendan O'Brien (record producer)
Atlantic Records singles